William James Loudon (June 25, 1860 – September 27, 1951, age 91) was a Canadian geologist and amateur photographer in Ontario.

Mount Loudon (10, 568 ft./3,221 m) in Banff National Park, Alberta is named in his honour.

References

External links
 
William James Loudon archival papers held at the University of Toronto Archives and Records Management Services

1860 births
1951 deaths
Canadian geologists